Patricia Idlette is an American actress known for her role as Kiffany in Showtime's Dead Like Me.  She also appeared in four episodes of Battlestar Galactica as politician Sarah Porter, and as Melanie Blackstone in the miniseries Amerika. Idlette portrayed Katherine Jackson, mother of Michael Jackson, in the 2004 biopic Man in the Mirror: The Michael Jackson Story. She appeared as Brenda's mother in Scary Movie 3 in 2003.

Originally from Miami, Florida, she trained as an actress in Florida and Michigan. She moved to Canada to join the repertory company of the Stratford Festival, acting in productions of A Midsummer Night's Dream, Antony and Cleopatra, The Winter's Tale, The Merchant of Venice, As You Like It and Medea. She remained based in Canada for many years, acting on stage in Toronto and Vancouver and appearing as a guest actor in television series such as Street Legal, The Littlest Hobo, Adderly, Katts and Dog and The X-Files.

She garnered a Dora Mavor Moore Award nomination for Best Performance by a Female in a Featured Role for her performance in Susan G. Cole's play A Fertile Imagination.

She moved back to Florida in the early 2000s.

Filmography

Film

Television

References

External links

Year of birth missing (living people)
Living people
American film actresses
American stage actresses
American television actresses
American expatriate actresses in Canada
African-American actresses
Actresses from Miami
20th-century American actresses
21st-century American actresses
20th-century African-American women
20th-century African-American people
21st-century African-American women
21st-century African-American people